Dunja is a 1955 Austrian historical drama film directed by Josef von Báky and starring Eva Bartok, Karlheinz Böhm, Ivan Desny and Walter Richter. It is an adaptation of the shorty story The Station Master by Alexander Pushkin, which had previously been made into the 1940 film Der Postmeister by Gustav Ucicky.

It was shot at the Sievering and Rosenhügel Studios in Vienna and on location in Burgenland. The film's sets were designed by the art director Fritz Maurischat.

Cast
 Eva Bartok as Dunja
 Ivan Desny as  Minski
 Karlheinz Böhm as Mitja
 Walter Richter as  Postmeister
 Maria Litto as  Mascha
 Eva Zilcher as Elisabeth
 Otto Wögerer as Serjej
 Ernst Jäger as  Oseip
 Lotte Medelsky as alte Frau
 Waldemar Leitgeb as Fürst Wlow
 Hannes Schiel as Alexej
 Bruno Dallansky as Pjotr
 Otto Schenk as Sascha
 Ernst Meister as  1. Fähnrich
 Jörg Liebenfels as  2. Fähnrich
 Georg Hartmann as  Hausmeister
 Kurt Müller-Böck as  Stephan, Offizier
 Peter Sparovitz as  Knecht

References

Bibliography 
 Fritsche, Maria. Homemade Men In Postwar Austrian Cinema: Nationhood, Genre and Masculinity . Berghahn Books, 2013.

External links

1955 films
1955 drama films
Austrian historical drama films
1950s historical drama films
1950s German-language films
Films set in Russia
Films set in the 19th century
Films based on works by Aleksandr Pushkin
Remakes of German films
Films shot at Rosenhügel Studios
Films shot at Sievering Studios